This is a list of Catholic churches in Algeria.

Cathedrals
Cathedral of the Sacred Heart, Algiers
Cathedral of Our Lady of the Seven Sorrows, Constantine
St. Mary's Cathedral, Oran
Pro-Cathedral of Ghardaïa, Ghardaïa

Basilicas

St Augustine's Basilica, Annaba
Our Lady of Africa, Algiers

Former churches

Cathedral of the Sacred Heart, Oran (public library)
Ketchaoua Mosque, Algiers

See also

Roman Catholicism in Algeria

 
Algeria
Lists of religious buildings and structures in Algeria